The 2004 Michigan House of Representatives elections were held on November 2, 2004, with partisan primaries to select the parties' nominees in the various districts on August 3, 2004.

Overview

Districts 1-28

Districts 29-55

Districts 56-83

 

 

 

 

 

 

 

 

 

 

 

 

 

 

Libertarian Party (US)
Lloyd Sherman
0
0

Districts 84-110

References

House of Representatives
2004
Michigan House of Representatives
November 2004 events in the United States